The 2004 North Dakota State Bison football team represented North Dakota State University in the 2004 NCAA Division I-AA football season.  It was the program's first season competing at the NCAA Division I-AA level. The Bison were led by second-year head coach Craig Bohl and played their home games at the Fargodome in Fargo, North Dakota. They finished the season with an overall record of 8–3 and tied for third in the Great West Conference with a 2–3 mark. North Dakota State was ineligible for the NCAA Division I-AA playoffs per NCAA rules, during their first four seasons at the NCAA Division I-AA/FCS level.

During the regular season, the Bison were never ranked in The Sports Network poll, but beat two of the three top-25 teams they played. After the playoffs, the Bison were ranked #24 in the final rankings.  During their first four years in Division I-AA (2004–2007), NDSU had a North Dakota State of 35–9 (.795) and were ranked in the top-25 32 out of 44 weeks.

Schedule

References

North Dakota State
North Dakota State Bison football seasons
North Dakota State Bison football